Historically, grammarians have described preposition stranding or p-stranding as the syntactic construction in which a so-called stranded, hanging or dangling preposition occurs somewhere other than immediately before its corresponding object; for example, at the end of a sentence. The term preposition stranding was coined in 1964, predated by stranded preposition in 1949. Linguists had previously identified such a construction as a sentence-terminal preposition or as a preposition at the end. This kind of construction is found in English, and more generally in other Germanic languages.

Preposition stranding is also found in languages outside the Germanic family, such as Vata and Gbadi (two languages in the Niger–Congo family), and certain dialects of French spoken in North America. 

P-stranding occurs in various syntactic contexts, including  passive voice, wh-movement, and sluicing.

Wh-movement and P-stranding 
Wh-movement—which involves wh-words like who, what, when, where, why and how—is a syntactic dependency between a sentence-initial wh-word and the gap that it is associated with. Wh-movement can lead to P-stranding if the object of the preposition is moved  to sentence-initial position, and the preposition is left behind. Wh-movement and P-stranding are both observed in many languages.

Preposition stranding allowed under wh-movement

In English 
An open interrogative often takes the form of a wh- question (beginning with a word like what or who)

P-stranding in English allows the separation of the preposition from its object. From the below examples, we can see that if we move the preposition along with the wh-word, the sentence will be ungrammatical. The preposition needs to stay at the end of the sentence to make it grammatical.
Which town did you come from?
 *From which town did you come?
What are you talking about?
 *About what are you talking?

In Danish 
P-stranding in Danish is banned only if the wh-word is referring to nominative cases. "Peter has spoken with <whom>", the wh-word <whom> is the accusative case. Therefore, p-stranding is allowed.

In Dutch 
Directional constructions

 R-pronouns

In French 
 Some dialects permit
Qui est-ce que tu as fait le gâteau pour?
 whom did you bake the cake for?
 Standard French requires
Pour qui est-ce que tu as fait le gâteau?
For whom did you bake the cake?

Preposition stranding disallowed under wh-movement

In German 
Prepositional stranding under regular wh-movement is allowed in some dialects of German but banned in standard German. 

For the interrogative word "woher" (from where / from what):

 Some dialects permit

 Standard German requires

In Greek 
Wh-movement in Greek states that the extracted PP must be in Spec-CP, which means the PP (me) needs to move with the wh-word (Pjon). From this, we can see that Greek allows pied piping in wh-movement but not prepositional stranding.

In Spanish 
Pied-piping is the only grammatical option in Spanish for constructing oblique relative clauses. Since pied-piping is the opposite of p-stranding, p-stranding in Spanish is not possible.

In Arabic

Emirati Arabic (EA) 
P-stranding in EA is only possible using which-NPs that strand prepositions and follow them with IP-deletion.

The preposition (fi) should be moved together with the wh-word (ʔaj) in order to make this sentence grammatical. 

It should be:

Libyan Arabic (LA) 
P-stranding in wh-movement sentences are normally banned in LA. However, a recent study found that a preposition seems to be stranded in a resumptive wh-question.

Sluicing and p-stranding 
Sluicing is a specific type of ellipsis that involves wh-phrases. In sluicing, the wh-phrase is stranded while the sentential portion of the constituent question is deleted. It is important to note that the preposition is stranded inside the constituent questions before sluicing. Some languages allow prepositional stranding under sluicing, while other languages ban it. The theory of preposition stranding generalization (PSG) suggests that if a language allows preposition stranding under wh-movement, that language will also allow preposition stranding under sluicing. PSG is not obeyed universally; examples of the banning of p-stranding under sluicing are provided below.

Preposition stranding under sluicing

In English 
Prepositional stranding under sluicing is allowed in English because prepositional phrases are not islands in English.  
 John laughed at someone, but I don’t know who he laughed at.

In Danish

In Spanish

In Arabic

Emirati Arabic

Libyan Arabic

P-stranding in other situations

Directional constructions

In Dutch 
A number of common Dutch adpositions can be used either prepositionally or postpositionally, with a slight change in possible meanings; for example, Dutch in can mean either in or into when used prepositionally, but can only mean into when used postpositionally. When postpositions, such adpositions can be stranded:
 short-distance movement: 

 Another way to analyze examples like the one above would be to allow arbitrary "postposition + verb" sequences to act as transitive separable prefix verbs (e.g. in + lopen → inlopen); but such an analysis would not be consistent with the position of in in the second example. (The postposition can also appear in the verbal prefix position: [...] dat hij zo'n donker bos niet durft in te lopen [...].)

Pseudopassives

In English 
Pseudopassives (prepositional passives or passive constructions) are the result of the movement of the object of a preposition to fill an empty subject position for a passive verb. This phenomenon is comparable to regular passives, which are formed through the movement of the object of the verb to subject position. In prepositional passives, unlike in wh-movement, the object of the preposition is not a wh-word but rather a pronoun or noun phrase:

 This bed looks as if it has been slept in.

In French 
 Some dialects permit
Robert a été parlé beaucoup de au meeting.
 'Robert was much talked about at the meeting.'
 Standard French requires
On a beaucoup parlé de Robert au meeting.

Relative clauses

In English 
Relative clauses in English can exhibit preposition stranding with or without an explicit relative pronoun:
This is the book that I told you about.
This is the book I told you about.

In French 
To standard French ears, these constructs all sound quite alien, and are thus considered as barbarisms or "anglicismes".
However, not all dialects of French allow preposition stranding to the same extent. For instance, Ontario French restricts preposition stranding to relative clauses with certain prepositions; in most dialects, stranding is impossible with the prepositions à (to) and de (of).

A superficially similar construction is possible in standard French in cases where the object is not moved, but implied, such as Je suis pour ("I'm all for (it)") or Il faudra agir selon ("We'll have to act according to (the situation)").

 Some dialects permit
Tu connais pas la fille que je te parle de.
 'You don't know the girl that I'm talking to you about.'
 Standard French requires
Tu ne connais pas la fille dont je te parle.
 Another more widespread non-standard variant: Tu ne connais pas la fille que je te parle.

R-pronouns

In Dutch 
Dutch prepositions generally do not take the ordinary neuter pronouns (het, dat, wat, etc.) as objects. Instead, they become postpositional suffixes for the corresponding r-pronouns (er, daar, waar, etc.): hence, not *over het (about it), but erover (literally thereabout). However, the r-pronouns can sometimes be moved to the left, thereby stranding the postposition:

Split construction

In German 
Some regional varieties of German show a similar phenomenon to some Dutch constructions with da(r)- and wo(r)- forms. This is called a split construction ("Spaltkonstruktion"). Standard German provides composite words for the particle and the bound preposition. The split occurs easily with a composite interrogative word (as shown in the English example) or with a composite demonstrative word (as shown in the Dutch example).

For example the demonstrative "davon" (of that / of those / thereof):
Standard German requires

Some dialects permit

Again, although the stranded postposition has nearly the same surface distribution as a separable verbal prefix ("herbekommen" is a valid composite verb), it would not be possible to analyze these Dutch and German examples in terms of the reanalyzed verbs *overpraten and *vonkaufen, for the following reasons:

The stranding construction is possible with prepositions that never appear as separable verbal prefixes (e.g., Dutch van, German von).
Stranding is not possible with any kind of object besides an r-pronoun.
Prefixed verbs are stressed on the prefix; in the string "von kaufen" in the above sentences, the preposition cannot be accented.
 And pronunciation allows distinguishing an actual usage of a verb like "herbekommen" from a split construction "her bekommen".

Controversy

In English 
Although preposition stranding has been found in English since the earliest times, it has often been the subject of controversy, and some usage advisors have attempted to form a prescriptive rule against it. In 1926, H. W. Fowler noted: "It is a cherished superstition that prepositions must, inspite of the incurable English instinct for putting them late [...] be kept true to their name & placed before the word they govern."

The earliest attested disparagement of preposition stranding in English is datable to the 17th century grammarian Joshua Poole, but it became popular after 1672, when the poet John Dryden objected to Ben Jonson's 1611 phrase "the bodies that those souls were frighted from". Dryden did not explain why he thought the sentence should be restructured to front the preposition. In his earlier writing, Dryden himself had employed terminal prepositions but he systematically removed them in later editions of his work, explaining that when in doubt he would translate his English into Latin to test its elegance. Latin has no construction comparable to preposition stranding. 

Usage writer Robert Lowth wrote in his 1762 textbook A Short Introduction to English Grammar that the construction was more suitable for informal than for formal English: "This is an Idiom which our language is strongly inclined to; it prevails in common conversation, and suits very well with the familiar style in writing; but the placing of the Preposition before the Relative is more graceful, as well as more perspicuous; and agrees much better with the solemn and elevated Style." However Lowth used the construction himself, including a humorously self-referential example in the passage quoted above, and his comments do not amount to a proscription.

A stronger view was taken by Edward Gibbon, who not only disparaged sentence-terminal prepositions but, noting that prepositions and adverbs are often difficult to distinguish, also avoided phrasal verbs which put on, over or under at the end of the sentence, even when these are clearly adverbs. By the 19th century, the tradition of English school teaching had come to deprecate the construction, and the proscription is still taught in some schools at the beginning of the 21st century. 

However, there were also voices which took an opposite view. Fowler dedicated four columns of his Dictionary of Modern English Usage to a rebuttal of the prescription: 

Overzealous avoidance of stranded prepositions was sometimes ridiculed for leading to unnatural-sounding sentences, including the quip apocryphally attributed to Winston Churchill: This is the sort of tedious nonsense up with which I will not put.

Today, most sources consider it to be acceptable in standard formal English.   As O'Conner and Kellerman point out: "Great literature from Chaucer to Milton to Shakespeare to the King James version of the Bible was full of so called terminal prepositions." Mignon Fogarty ("Grammar Girl") says, "nearly all grammarians agree that it's fine to end sentences with prepositions, at least in some cases."

Sources

Notes

References

Further reading 
 An Internet pilgrim's guide to stranded prepositions
Haegeman, Liliane, and Jacqueline Guéron. 1999. English Grammar: a Generative Perspective. Oxford: Blackwell. .
 Hornstein, Norbert, and Amy Weinberg. 1981. "Case theory and preposition stranding." Linguistic Inquiry 12:55–91. 
 Koopman, Hilda. 2000. "Prepositions, postpositions, circumpositions, and particles." In The Syntax of Specifiers and Heads, pp. 204–260. London: Routledge. .
 
 Takami, Ken-ichi. 1992. Preposition Stranding: From Syntactic to Functional Analyses. Berlin: Mouton de Gruyter. .
 van Riemsdijk, Henk. 1978. A Case Study in Syntactic Markedness: The Binding Nature of Prepositional Phrases. Dordrecht: Foris. .
Fowler, Henry. 1926. "Preposition at end." A Dictionary of Modern English Usage. Oxford: Clarendon Press. Wordsworth Edition reprint, 1994, 

Parts of speech
Word order
English usage controversies
Syntactic transformation